Maya Rani Paul was an Indian politician. She was elected thrice as Berhampore Vidhan Sabha Constituency in West Bengal Legislative Assembly. Her husband Sankar Das Paul was also elected thrice as Berhampore Vidhan Sabha Constituency in West Bengal Legislative Assembly. She died on 15 March 2019 at the age of 86.

References

1930s births
2019 deaths
Trinamool Congress politicians from West Bengal
Members of the West Bengal Legislative Assembly
Women in West Bengal politics